Enkhbatyn Gantuyaa (born 26 May 1995) is a Mongolian freestyle wrestler. She won one of the bronze medals in the women's 62 kg event at the 2021 World Wrestling Championships in Oslo, Norway.

References

External links 
 

1995 births
Living people
Mongolian female sport wrestlers
World Wrestling Championships medalists
21st-century Mongolian women